The Norton Jayhawks were a minor league baseball team based in Norton, Kansas. The Norton Jayhawks played in the 1929 and 1930 seasons as members of the Class D level Nebraska State League and were the only minor league team based in Norton. The Jayhawks hosted home minor league games at Elmwood Park.

History
Norton gained a minor league team during the 1929 season when the Beatrice Blues franchise of the Class D level Nebraska State League moved from Beatrice, Nebraska to Norton, Kansas. Norton had previously sought admission to the Nebraska State League, but had been denied. The Norton Jayhawks then played the 1929 and 1930 seasons in the Nebraska State League. The stock market crash of 1928 greatly affected minor league baseball as The Great Depression gripped the nation, subsequently 12 of the existing 26 baseball minor leagues folded between 1928 and 1933. The Nebraska State League was able to keep playing, but it folded the Jayhawks on August 25, 1930 with seven games remaining. Another league member, the Fairbury Jeffersons, were folded after the 1930 season.

In their first season of play, the 1929 Norton Jayhawks ended the season in fifth place in the eight–team Nebraska State League standings. Norton joined the Fairbury Jeffersons, Grand Island Islanders, Lincoln Links, McCook Generals, Norfolk Elkhorns, North Platte Buffaloes and York Dukes in league play. 

The Beatrice/Norton team ended the season with a 54–60 overall record, playing the 1929 season under manager Hal Brokaw. Norton finished 19.0 games behind the first place McCook Generals in the final Nebraska State League standings.

The Norton Jayhawks franchise folded before the end of the 1930 Nebraska State League season. The Norton franchise folded on August 25, 1930 and the final seven games of the season were forfeited, as the Nebraska State League continued play through August 31, 1930. With their seven forfeit games included, Norton finished last in the eight–team league with a 33–87 final record. Managed by Earl Harrison and Frank Sidle, the Jayhawks finished 52.5 games behind the first  place McCook Generals.

Norton permanently folded following the 1930 season and did not return to the 1931 Nebraska State League. Norton, Kansas has not hosted another minor league team.

The ballpark
The Norton Jayhawks played home minor league games at Elmwood Park. Today, the park is still in use as a public park with ballfields. Elmwood Park is located at 400 South State, Norton, Kansas.

Timeline

Year–by–year records

Notable alumni
No Norton Jayhawk players advanced to play in the major leagues.

References

External links
Norton - Baseball Reference

Defunct minor league baseball teams
1929 establishments in Kansas
1930 disestablishments in Kansas
Baseball teams established in 1929
Baseball teams disestablished in 1930
Professional baseball teams in Kansas
Norton County, Kansas
Defunct baseball teams in Kansas
Baseball teams established in 1920
Nebraska State League teams